Boubers-lès-Hesmond is a commune in the Pas-de-Calais département in the Hauts-de-France region in northern France.

Geography
Boubers-lès-Hesmond is a small village situated some 10 miles (16 km) east of Montreuil-sur-Mer on the D149 road.

Population

See also
Communes of the Pas-de-Calais department

References

Communes of Pas-de-Calais